Alain Mogès (born 22 July 1992) a French Guianan professional footballer who plays as a defender for Championnat National 3 club Alès and the French Guiana national team.

Club career 
After starting football at USL Montjoly in his native French Guiana, Mogès moved to metropolitan France, where he played for the youth team at Amicale Pascal Calais. In 2013, he played with the first team of Calais, with which he won the second group of the Championnat de France Amateur.

In summer 2016, Mogès joined English club Harlow Town, making thirteen appearances and being named player of the match on two occasions. In November 2016, he joined Salford City on dual registration terms, and made his debut for the club in a Manchester Premier Cup tie at Hyde United.

In 2021, after four years with Angoulême, Mogès signed for Alès.

International career 
Mogès made his debut for the French Guiana national team in 2014.

References

External links
 
 

1992 births
Living people
French Guianan footballers
French Guiana international footballers
Association football central defenders
Calais RUFC players
Harlow Town F.C. players
Salford City F.C. players
Angoulême Charente FC players
French expatriate footballers
French Guianan expatriate footballers
Expatriate footballers in England
French expatriate sportspeople in England